Patrick Ciurria (born 9 February 1995) is an Italian professional footballer player who plays as a forward for  club Monza.

Club career

Spezia 
From 2011 to January 2013, Ciurria played for Castellarano's youth system, before moving on loan to Spezia, with whom he played in the Campionato Primavera 1 in the second part of the 2012–13 season. At the end of the season he was bought outright by Spezia, making his first-team debut in the 2013–14 season; Ciurria made his Serie B debut for Spezia on 24 August 2013, in a 0–0 against Cittadella. He made five appearances in the Serie B and three appearances in the Coppa Italia.

Ciurria played two more seasons at Spezia, during the 2014–15 season (one league game and two cup games) and in the 2015–16 season, in which he played more frequently, scoring a goal in 18 appearances in the Serie B, and making three appearances in the Coppa Italia.

Loans to Südtirol and Siena 
In summer 2016, Ciurria was loaned to Lega Pro club Südtirol. He made 19 appearances in the 2016–17 season, and a game in the Coppa Italia Lega Pro. In January 2017, Ciurria returned to Spezia, who then sent him on loan Siena; he scored three goals in 15 appearances in the Lega Pro.

Pordenone 
In summer 2017, Ciurria was sold outright to Pordenone. In the 2017–18 season, he scored six goals in 29 appearances in the Serie C. Ciurria helped Pordenone with the league title in the 2018–19 season, marking the club's first promotion to the Serie B; he scored three goals in 37 games.

In the 2019–20 Serie B season, Ciurria scored five league goals in 35 appearances, and made one Coppa Italia appearance. The 2020–21 season was a prolific one for Ciurria, seeing him score nine goals and make 11 assists in 36 league games – he was the league top assist provider.

Monza 
On 31 July 2021, Ciurria joined fellow Serie B side Monza on a three-year deal. He made his debut on 14 August, in a 2–1 Coppa Italia defeat to Cittadella in the first round. Ciurria helped Monza to their first Serie A promotion, after winning the promotion play-off final against Pisa. He made his Serie A debut for Monza on 13 August 2022, as a substitute in a 2–1 home defeat to Torino. Ciurria first played as a starter on 18 September, assisting Christian Gytkjær in Monza's first-ever Serie A win, 1–0 at home against Italian giants Juventus.

International career 
Between 2013 and 2014, Ciurria scored four goals in 11 games for the Italy national under-19 team. He later also played three games with the under-20 team, with whom he participated in the Four Nations Tournament in 2014 and 2016.

Style of play 
Ciurria is a versatile forward who can be used as an attacking midfielder, right winger, striker or second striker.

Personal life 

Career statistics

Club

Honours 
Pordenone
 Serie C: 2018–19 (Group B)
 Supercoppa di Serie C: 2019

Individual
 Serie B top assist provider: 2020–21

References

External links
 Profile at A.C. Monza 
 

1995 births
Living people
People from Sassuolo
Sportspeople from the Province of Modena
Footballers from Emilia-Romagna
Italian footballers
Association football forwards
P.D. Castellarano players
Spezia Calcio players
F.C. Südtirol players
A.C.N. Siena 1904 players
Pordenone Calcio players
A.C. Monza players
Serie B players
Serie C players
Serie A players
Italy youth international footballers